Leslie Nichols (1907-date of death unknown), was a male badminton player from England.

Badminton career
Nichols born in Islington  was a three times winner of the All England Open Badminton Championships. He won the doubles with his younger brother Ralph Nichols, for three consecutive years from 1936 until 1938.

Family
He and his brother lived at 1 Willow Bridge Road, Canonbury in 1911.

References

English male badminton players
1907 births
Year of death missing